Sri Lanka competed at the 2017 World Aquatics Championships in Budapest, Hungary from 14 July to 30 July. The team consisted of four participants and went medalless during the competition.

Swimming

Sri Lanka received Universality invitations from FINA to send four swimmers (two men and two women) to the World Championships. Matthew Abeysinghe was initially selected on the entry list of his respective events, but did not compete.

References

Nations at the 2017 World Aquatics Championships
2017 in Sri Lankan sport
Sri Lanka at the World Aquatics Championships